Timeline of transport in Oslo covers key incidents within transport in Oslo, the capital of Norway.

The first railway opened in 1854, in 1875 the first horsecar tramway and in 1966 the rapid transit.

See also
 Timeline of Oslo

Notes

References

Oslo
Transport in Oslo
History of Oslo
Transport in Oslo